The Sri Lanka national cricket team toured Oman in October 2021 to play two twenty-over matches. The matches were played in Muscat, Oman, with both teams using the fixtures as their preparations for the 2021 ICC Men's T20 World Cup. The series was confirmed by Sri Lanka Cricket CEO Ashley de Silva and Oman coach Duleep Mendis. Sri Lanka won the first match by 19 runs, and the second match by five wickets to win the series 2–0.

Squads

As well as the players selected in Sri Lanka's T20 World Cup squad, including their reserve players, Ramesh Mendis, Pathum Nissanka, Ashen Bandara and Lakshan Sandakan were also included as additional players.

T20 series

1st T20

2nd T20

References

External links
 Series home at ESPN Cricinfo
 Series home at Cricket Archive

2021 in Sri Lankan cricket
Sri Lankan cricket tours abroad
International cricket competitions in 2021–22